Sweepstake Annie is a 1935 American comedy film directed by William Nigh and starring Tom Brown, Marian Nixon and Wera Engels.

Cast

References

Bibliography
 Pitts, Michael R. Poverty Row Studios, 1929–1940: An Illustrated History of 55 Independent Film Companies, with a Filmography for Each. McFarland & Company, 2005.

External links
 

1935 films
1935 comedy films
American comedy films
Films directed by William Nigh
American black-and-white films
1930s English-language films
1930s American films